Freylinia is a genus of flowering plants in the figwort family Scrophulariaceae. They are native to Africa.

Species
Species include: 
Freylinia crispa    
Freylinia decurrens
Freylinia densiflora  
Freylinia helmei  
Freylinia lanceolata 
Freylinia longiflora 
Freylinia tropica
Freylinia undulata
Freylinia visseri
Freylinia vlokii

References

 
Scrophulariaceae genera